Spirit of the Boogie is the sixth studio album by Kool & the Gang, released in 1975. It can be seen as a follow-up to Wild and Peaceful (1973); the instrumental "Jungle Jazz" uses the same basic rhythm track heard in "Jungle Boogie", but lets the players improvise on their instruments (saxophone, trumpet and flute). References to earlier works can be noticed ("Ancestral Ceremony" contains the line: "making merry music...", which was the name of a song from their 1972 album, Good Times). "Spirit of the Boogie" features Donald Boyce, who was rapping on "Jungle Boogie". Some African influence can be felt, and the band even play in a West-Indian style on "Caribbean Festival", another instrumental track, with once more much room for improvisation.

The LP cover mistakenly lists "Cosmic Energy" as track 4 instead of "Sunshine and Love". "Cosmic Energy" was actually released on the next album, Love & Understanding.

In one of the songs in the album, entitled "Jungle Jazz", the repetitive drum beat that is heard after the drum fill at the beginning has been sampled in over 50 songs, including "Don't Walk Away" by Jade and "Pump Up The Volume" by M/A/R/R/S; it can also be found as a sample in FL Studio's files.

Record World said that the single "Caribbean Festival" "lived up to its title" and has "whirlwind rhythms."

Track listing

Personnel
Kool & the Gang
 Ronald Bell – arrangements, vocals (1), acoustic piano (1, 2, 5, 7, 8), clavinet (1), ARP synth bass (1), tenor saxophone (1, 2, 3, 5, 6, 8), percussion (2, 3, 5, 6), ARP synthesizer (5, 7, 8), kalimba (5), alto flute (7)
 Ricky West – vocals (1, 2, 5), clavinet (2, 3, 5), acoustic piano (6), Moog synthesizer (6)
 Claydes Charles Smith – guitar (1, 2, 3, 6, 7, 8), arrangements (8)
 Kevin Bell – guitar (2, 6), arrangements (8)
 Robert "Kool" Bell – bass guitar (1-8), vocals (1), arrangements (8)
 George "Funky" Brown – drums (1-8), vocals (1, 2, 6), percussion (3, 5, 6), acoustic piano (6), arrangements (6, 8)
 Dennis "D.T." Thomas – alto saxophone (1, 2, 3, 6), vocals (1, 2, 5, 7), flute (3), percussion (3, 8), arrangements (8)
 Otha Nash – trombone (1, 2, 3, 6, 8), vocals (1, 2, 3, 6), arrangements (8)
 Robert "Spike" Mickens – trumpet (1, 2, 3, 5, 6, 8), vocals (1, 2), percussion (2, 3, 5, 8), arrangements (8)

Additional Personnel 
 Don Boyce – vocals (1)
 Something Sweet – backing vocals (5, 6)

Production
 Producers – Kool & The Gang
 Recorded and Mixed by Harvey Goldberg	
 Overdub Engineers – Godfrey Diamond, Alec Head, Ray Janos, Terry Rosiello and Ron St. Germain.
 Mixed at Record Plant (Los Angeles, CA).
 Artwork – Frank Daniel and Diane Nelson 
 Photography – Henry Arvinger

Charts

Singles

References

External links
 

Kool & the Gang albums
De-Lite Records albums
1975 albums